Opalikhi is a rural locality (a village) in Gorodishchenskoye Rural Settlement, Nyuksensky District, Vologda Oblast, Russia. The population was 25 as of 2002.

Geography 
Opalikhi is located 51 km south of Nyuksenitsa (the district's administrative centre) by road. Malye Ivki is the nearest rural locality.

References 

Rural localities in Nyuksensky District